Chapel of San Ramon (also called the Benjamin Foxen Memorial Chapel and the Sisquoc Chapel
) is a chapel and cemetery located in Santa Maria, California in the United States. It is listed on the California Historical Landmarks list and is also the first historic landmark listed by the county of Santa Barbara. It is considered a quality example of "the transition between the architecture of the old missions and the frame churches of the American settlers." It was also one of the first Catholic churches in the Santa Maria Valley.

History

Frederick and Ramona Foxen Wickenden purchased the property where the chapel sits from the federal government in 1872. The couple donated land for the chapel and a cemetery. Frederick Wickenden sold 5,000 sheep to buy redwood for the chapel's construction; Wickenden, his brother-in-law Thomas Foxen, and Chris Clausen built it in 1875. In 1876, the first burial was made in the cemetery, that of Benjamin Foxen, father of Ramona Wickenden and Thomas Foxen. In 1879, the chapel was dedicated by Francisco Mora y Borrell in behalf of Saint Ramon. In 1908, the chapel joined the Parish of Saint Mary. Regular services were canceled that year, and the church was used only for special occasions. In 1936, the chapel received a new roof and paint. R.E. Easton rededicated the building.

In 1950, the Native Daughters of the Golden West declared the chapel as their own historic landmark and called it "Benjamin Foxen Memorial Chapel." In 1958-59, the chapel was renovated by Winston Wickenden. He replaced the original foundation, made of wood, with concrete. In 1966, it became the first historic landmark listed by the county of Santa Barbara.

Contemporary times

The chapel began to suffer from frequent vandalism and also had structural problems. In 1972, the San Ramon Preservation group was formed to help protect the property from additional vandalism. In January, 1975, the chapel was named to the California Historical Landmarks list. A dedication ceremony was held in August and mass was held by Father Bertin Foxen, great-grandson of Benjamin Foxen. In December of that year, a gate was installed at the entrance to the grounds and was dedicated as the John W. Woolsey Memorial Gate. The San Ramon Chapel Preservation Committee (SRCPC), the organizing body that maintains the property and building, became a non-profit in 1976. Mass began again weekly in November. In 1978, the chapel received a new roof and glass windows.

A new foundation was installed in 1983 and additional renovations took place, totaling $12,154. In 1985, the first electric heater was installed in the chapel. Stations of the Cross were installed on site by Drew Crosby in 1986. The next year, SRCPC offered to turn the property over to the Roman Catholic Archdiocese of Los Angeles. They declined the offer and SRCPC continued to maintain the property. The first water well was installed in 1988. As of 1999, renovations to the chapel continued.

See also
 History of Santa Barbara, California
California Historical Landmarks in Santa Barbara County, California

References

Santa Maria, California
Roman Catholic chapels in the United States
California Historical Landmarks
Churches in Santa Barbara County, California
Roman Catholic churches completed in 1875
1875 establishments in California
19th-century Roman Catholic church buildings in the United States